Michele Westmorland is an American photographer who specializes in underwater photography. Westmorland is a fellow of the International League of Conservation Photographers and The Explorers Club. She runs her own company, Westmorland LLC, in Redmond, Washington where she resides.

Westmorland's preferred area of travel is Papua New Guinea. Her stock is represented by Getty, Corbis, and Fotostock

Early life
Westmorland is a Seattle native. She worked in the corporate world for twenty two years before beginning photography.

Westmorland attended Barry University in Miami, Florida from 1990 to 1992.

Publications

Westmorland's photographs have been published in publications such as National Geographic Traveler and Adventure magazines, and Outside magazine.

Awards and honors

Westmorland was inducted into the Women Divers Hall of Fame in 2011. She has also won several awards, including the Environmental Photography Invitational, Photo District News, and the PNG Underwater Photo Competition.

References 

American photographers
Living people
1966 births
People from Redmond, Washington
American women photographers
American underwater divers
Underwater photographers
Fellows of the Explorers Club
21st-century American women